J. Bradley Pirie (born October 21, 1955) is a Canadian former ice hockey player. He played with Team Canada at the 1980 Winter Olympics.

Pirie played with the University of Guelph Gryphons where he was a perennial all star and later inducted into the university Sports Hall of Fame. Next he played for the Peterborough Petes and with the team represented Canada at the 1974 World Junior Ice Hockey Championships.

He also represented Canada at the 1980 Winter Olympics held in Lake Placid, where he scored one goal and two assists in 6 games.

After getting a bachelor's degree in economics from the University of Guelph, he eventually joined his father Ron's company, Pirie-McKie & Associates. He resides in Toronto, Ontario and has three grown children, a daughter, Sarah Alexandra (b. 1991), and two sons, Jack Ronald (b. 1993) and Benjamin Gregory (b. 1995).

References

External links

1955 births
Living people
Canadian ice hockey defencemen
Dallas Black Hawks players
Ice hockey people from Ontario
Ice hockey players at the 1980 Winter Olympics
Olympic ice hockey players of Canada
Sportspeople from Guelph